Patsy Lawlor (17 March 1933 – 19 December 1997) was an Irish politician, nurse and businesswoman. She was elected to Seanad Éireann on the Cultural and Educational Panel in 1981 as a Fine Gael member. She lost her seat at the 1983 Seanad election. She was president of the Irish Countrywomen's Association for many years. She became the first woman to chair Kildare County Council and Kildare VEC.

At the 1991 local elections, she was elected as an Independent member to Kildare County Council for the Naas electoral area. She was an unsuccessful independent candidate at the 1992 general election for the Kildare constituency.

Her son Anthony Lawlor was elected as a Fine Gael Teachta Dála (TD) for the Kildare North constituency at the 2011 general election.

See also
Families in the Oireachtas

References

1933 births
1997 deaths
Fine Gael senators
Independent politicians in Ireland
Members of the 15th Seanad
20th-century women members of Seanad Éireann
Politicians from County Kildare